Magliano Alfieri is a comune (municipality) in the Province of Cuneo in the Italian region Piedmont, located about  southeast of Turin and about  northeast of Cuneo.

Magliano Alfieri borders the following municipalities: Castagnito, Castagnole delle Lanze, Castellinaldo, Govone, Neive, and Priocca.

Demographic evolution

References

External links

Roero
Cities and towns in Piedmont

lmo:Maglian del Roé